The Promoting Resilience and Efficiency in Preparing for Attacks and Responding to Emergencies Act, or PREPARE Act, of 2017 (H.R. 2922) is a bill introduced in the United States House of Representatives by U.S. Representative Dan Donovan (R-New York). The bill would assist American attempts to protect the nation from potential terror attacks and fortify emergency response capabilities through reauthorizing grants for programs that are necessary for disaster relief.

Some of the applications of these grants include training for first responders and improving communication between different levels of government to better respond to cyber threats. The bill also aims to promote transparency and minimize fraud by holding the Federal Emergency Management Agency to account. Additionally, the bill forces federal agencies to meet a standard of readiness so that they are always prepared to respond effectively and efficiently during emergency situations. Representative Donovan serves as the current chairman of the House Subcommittee on Emergency Preparedness, Response, and Communications.

In June 2017, the PREPARE Act was unanimously passed by the House Committee on Homeland Security as a component of the Department of Homeland Security Authorization Act of 2017.

In addition to the House Committee on Homeland Security, the bill was referred to the House Committee on Transportation and Infrastructure, House Committee on Energy and Commerce, and Subcommittee on Emergency Preparedness, Response and Communications. As of mid-July 2017, the bill currently awaits further action in the House.

The bill has a total of 3 cosponsors: Representatives Michael McCaul (R-Texas), Peter King (R-New York), and Brian Fitzpatrick (R-Pennsylvania).

Donovan introduced the bill as a result of a spike in severe terror attacks and natural disasters around the world. He said, "This bill provides our first responders and communities with the resources they need to prevent and prepare for emergency situations, while also helping ensure that our agencies are constantly improving our federal response capabilities." As additional motivations for writing the PREPARE Act, Donovan cited a Homeland Security Committee report that discovered 39 jihadi plots that were completely developed in the United States, along with the London and Manchester terror attacks. Rather than simply focus on security threats posed by terrorism, Donovan lamented increasingly frequent and severe natural disasters. He pointed to 15 different extreme weather events in the United States in 2016 alone, each causing more than $1 billion in economic loss.

Background 

As threats against the United States from a multitude of sources continue to expand, terror attacks and climate change have become particular areas of focus. In the past, the federal government has not been completely prepared for either terror attacks or consequences of worsening climate change. The PREPARE Act would provide solutions to issues in American defense strategies so that the government can become more capable of responding to emergency situations, especially those posed by terror and climate change.

Explaining lack of American readiness for certain terror attacks, Michael Waltz, former U.S. Army Special Forces commander, said, "... the Department of Homeland Security and the FBI are lagging and need to get much smarter to focus… before there's a major incident we all fear."

Although the Department of Homeland Security does not publicly release data about the number of terror attack attempts per day and lives saved as a result of its efforts due to the inherently private nature of the information, the department plays a central role in preventing terror attacks and protecting the American public. The PREPARE Act aims to reinforce the Department of Homeland Security's mission of terrorism prevention by more clearly outlying responsibilities of its many units.

American security has been damaged in the past as a result of cyber attacks, which are discussed under the PREPARE Act. Thirteen federal agencies and institutions have been hacked since 2014, including the Department of Health and Human Services, the White House, the United States Postal Service, the Department of State, the Federal Aviation Administration, the Internal Revenue Service, and the Office of Personnel Management, among others. These hacks affected tens of millions of government employees and private citizens. Cyber threats continue to grow, especially against the United States government and its subdivisions.

Natural disasters have also become an increasingly dangerous threat to the American public, and the PREPARE Act aims to make emergency and relief services more efficient so that as many victims can be assisted as quickly as possible. Over the past five decades, most of the United States has witnessed spikes in extended periods of excessively warm temperatures, torrential storms, and severe floods and droughts. In 2011 and 2012, the number of intense heat waves was approximately triple the long-term average. The 2011 drought in Texas and Oklahoma was a result of more than 100 days over 100 degrees Fahrenheit. Both states set new records for the hottest summer since record-keeping began in 1895. Depleted water sources led to $10 billion in direct losses to agriculture in those two states alone. In other regions, heavy rainfall has led to significant flooding problems in certain regions. Between 1959 and 2005, 4,586 Americans have been killed by floodwaters. Damage to property and crops averaged $8 billion per year between 1981 and 2011. Since the early 1980s, when scientists began to collect accurate data on hurricanes, Atlantic hurricane storms have grown in intensity, frequency, and duration, partially as a result of higher surface temperatures of ocean waters. Models project future hurricanes to be the strongest in recorded history.

The PREPARE Act aims to minimize fraud in government response to natural disasters through the inclusion of language from the Flood Insurance Mitigation and Policyholder Protection Act. A 60 Minutes report found that engineers who were working for insurance companies that were operating under the Federal Emergency Management Agency altered damage reports of homes that were harmed by Hurricane Sandy. The engineers reported less damage than had actually occurred in changed reports, in attempts to decrease the amount of money given to homeowners who were desperate for repair funds.

Major provisions 

The PREPARE Act aims to equip emergency response services with necessary tools to respond in an optimal fashion to challenges to American security, especially those posed by terror and natural disasters. Because the PREPARE Act discusses a wide variety of Department of Homeland Security operations, the bill is organized into four key sections:
 Title I - Grants, Training, Exercises, and Coordination. This section of the bill retains funds allocated to the Urban Area Security Initiative and describes the state Homeland Security Grant Program, along with other programs that seek to aid law enforcement officers in their continuous battle against terrorism (both traditional and cyber). 
 Title II - Communications. This section of the bill includes details on the Office of Emergency Communications, describes the role of the Office of Emergency Communications Director, explains the responsibilities of the National Emergency Communications Plan, and encourages the sharing of information between agencies to mitigate cyber threats through discussion of the Public Safety Broadband Network.
 Title III - Medical Preparedness. In this portion of the bill, Donovan discusses the position of the Chief Medical Officer and a Medical Countermeasures Program that would better prepare the nation's readiness for a health threat, especially resources operating under the Department of Homeland Security itself.
 Title IV - Management. The final area of the bill provides details on mission support, modernization of system, and a plan for supporting human capital. 
Donovan outlined the major aspects of the PREPARE Act that he believes will best aid the Department of Homeland Security:
 Reauthorization of grant programs responsible for training and providing resources to first responders.
 Improvement of transparency and accountability related to Federal Emergency Management Agency grant usage. 
 Implementation of minimum readiness standards to guarantee that federal agencies are prepared to respond to disasters at the time they happen to strike.
 Enhancement of cyber-threat and information sharing between authorities at all levels, including local, state, and federal.
 Requirement that federal departments and agencies work together to close capability gaps that are exposed in after-action reports.
Particular clauses of the bill amend operations of the Department of Homeland Security in new ways. For example:
 The Allowable Uses clause authorizes two new uses of funding. The first is to reinvigorate the American response to potential medical crises, including the creation and continued upkeep of a pharmaceutical stockpile, which would include medical kits and protective services for first responders, victims, and impacted populations after chemical or biological attacks. The second is to optimize cybersecurity to strengthen preparation and potential to effectively respond to a wide range of cyber threats. 
 The Port Security Program authorizes $200 million per year for grants through 2022.  
 The Department of Homeland Security would be required to assist fusion centers in a more active way to protect cybersecurity. The department would have to provide technical support, information to indicate cyber threats, defense techniques, potential risks to cybersecurity, and knowledge specific to maintaining technological integrity during elections. 
 Under the Medical Countermeasures Program, the DHS would be responsible for enhancing the readiness of personnel to protect resources (including employees and animals) in the case of a chemical, biological, radiological, nuclear, or explosives attack. 
Regarding FEMA fraud, the PREPARE Act aims to minimize issues by amending procedures several ways. The language in the bill forces engineers to give copies of original reports to homeowners, so accountability can be maximized. Further, the bill gives more time to homeowners to file appeals or pursue lawsuits in court if the National Flood Insurance Program denies claim appeals. The bill extends the time period from one year to two years to file an appeal, and allows people to file lawsuits up to ninety days after a claim is denied.

Legislative history 
During the 114th Congress, on September 22, 2015, Representative Martha McSally (R-Arizona) introduced an earlier version of the bill. The bill was passed in the U.S. House on April 26, 2016, and was received in the Senate and referred to the Senate Committee on Homeland Security and Governmental Affairs on April 27, 2016. No further action was taken.

On June 15, 2017, Donovan introduced the bill. After introduction:
 6/15/17 - The bill was referred to the House Energy and Commerce Committee, the House Transportation and Infrastructure Committee, and the House Homeland Security Committee. 
 6/28/17 - The bill was referred to the committee's Subcommittee on Emergency Preparedness, Response, and Communications. 
As of July 11, 2017, the bill awaits further action in the House of Representatives.

See also 
 Emergency management
 First responders

References

External links 
 FEMA official website
 National Preparedness System (FEMA-operated program)
 United States Department of Homeland Security official website

Proposed legislation of the 115th United States Congress